Setec may refer to: 
 Setec (Company of Finland), the former Bank of Finland's banknote printer.
 Société d'études techniques et économiques, a French engineering company.